was a Japanese politician of the Liberal Democratic Party, a member of the House of Representatives in the Diet (national legislature). A native of Himi, Toyama and graduate of Ritsumeikan University, he was elected to the assembly of Toyama Prefecture for the first time in 1971. From 1979 to 1986 he ran four times for seats in the House of Representatives, albeit unsuccessfully. He was elected for the first time in 1990.

References

External links 
 Official website in Japanese.

Members of the House of Representatives (Japan)
Ritsumeikan University alumni
People from Toyama Prefecture
2015 deaths
1932 births
Liberal Democratic Party (Japan) politicians
21st-century Japanese politicians